The 1987 Minnesota Twins won the World Series for the first time since moving from Washington in 1961, the second time that the franchise won the World Series (the Washington Senators won it in 1924). Having won only 85 games during the 1987 regular season, they won the World Series with the then-fewest regular season wins since Major League Baseball expanded to a 162-game season in 1961, and the fewest of any team since the 1889 New York Giants (excluding the strike-shortened 1981 and the COVID-19 pandemic-shortened 2020 seasons and later surpassed by the 2006 St. Louis Cardinals who won 83 games that season). They also became the first team to win the World Series despite being outscored by their opponents in the regular season, having scored 786 runs and allowed 806.

Tom Kelly became the fifth manager to win a World Series in his first full season on the job, and one of seven total, as of 2019, to accomplish the feat.

Offseason
 November 12, 1986: The Twins traded a player to be named later to the New York Mets for Ron Gardenhire. The Twins completed the trade by sending Dominic Iasparro (minors) to the Mets on April 4, 1987. Gardenhire would spend the next 28 years in the Twins Organization including a 13-year stint as manager from 2002-2014.
 January 9, 1987: Juan Berenguer was signed as a free agent by the Twins.
February 3, 1987: Neal Heaton, Yorkis Pérez, Jeff Reed and minor leaguer Al Cardwood were traded by the Twins to the Montreal Expos for Jeff Reardon and Tom Nieto.
 February 20, 1987: Minor leaguer Mike Shade was traded by the Twins to the Montreal Expos for Al Newman.
 February 24, 1987: Billy Sample was signed as a free agent by the Minnesota Twins.

Regular season

The Twins were 85-77, first in the American League West, two games ahead of the Kansas City Royals. The team had one of the lowest winning percentages ever for a World Series champion, at .525.  They also had the remarkably bad road record of 29-52 (.358 percentage) but made up for it winning 56 home games (best in MLB).  Fortunately for the Twins, they played in a very weak division; only two teams finished above .500 and only 10 games separated the Twins from the last-place California Angels (the previous year's division champion) and Texas Rangers.  The Twins' 85-77 was the lowest for a World Series champion for nearly two decades, until the 2006 St. Louis Cardinals won the World Series with an 83-78 record.

1987 was the first year the Twins started using their modernized logos and uniforms, which are still in use today.

Only one Twin made the All-Star Game, outfielder Kirby Puckett. The highest paid player was Kent Hrbek at $1,310,000; followed by Bert Blyleven at $1,150,000.

Over a late August weekend at Milwaukee, Puckett went 10 for 11, with four homers and two doubles, raising his batting average 13 points.  The feat tied a major league record.

Joe Niekro, a pitcher for the Twins, was suspended for 10 games when umpire Tim Tschida discovered an emery board in his pocket.  Tschida suspected Niekro was scuffing the ball, and saw the emery board fly out of Niekro's pocket.  Niekro said he was filing his nails in the dugout, but American League president Dr. Bobby Brown didn't believe him, and ordered the suspension.  When the Twins won the pennant, Niekro set a major league record as he'd waited 20½ years since his debut to reach a World Series game.

2,081,976 fans attended Twins games, the sixth highest total in the American League.

The Homer Hanky was introduced in 1987's pennant drive. When the Twins made the playoffs for the first time since 1970, three members of that team remained with the club now seventeen years later.  Bert Blyleven was the only remaining player; Tony Oliva became the hitting coach and Rick Renick the third base coach.

Offense
This was the last year for a long time that the Twins were stocked with power hitters.  In particular, Kirby Puckett, Kent Hrbek, Gary Gaetti, and Tom Brunansky combined to hit 125 home runs.  (The team as a whole hit 196.)  Hrbek, Gaetti, and Brunansky each surpassed 30 home runs, a number that no Twin would reach again until Justin Morneau and Torii Hunter in 2006.

Kirby Puckett led the AL with 207 hits.

Despite the power in their lineup, the Twins were outscored 806-786, one of the largest such differentials for a World Series champion.

Pitching
The top three starting pitchers, Frank Viola, Bert Blyleven, and Les Straker provided stability throughout the year.  Mike Smithson, Joe Niekro, and Jeff Bittiger were less reliable. Newly acquired closer Jeff Reardon was a reliable option at the end of games.  Juan Berenguer was the most reliable set-up man, posting a 3.94 ERA.

Bert Blyleven led the AL with 46 home runs allowed.

Defense
The defense was not as strong as would be typical for Twins teams under manager Tom Kelly.  Hrbek was the most reliable fielder at first base, and the outfield of Dan Gladden, Puckett, and Brunansky was reliable.
Third baseman Gary Gaetti and center fielder Kirby Puckett each won their second Gold Glove Award.

Season standings

Record vs. opponents

Game log

|-style= background:#cfc
| 1 || April 7 || Athletics || 5–4 (10) || Frazier (1–0) || Krueger (0–1) || — || 43,548 || 1–0 || W1
|-style= background:#cfc
| 2 || April 8 || Athletics || 4–1 || Viola (1–0) || Plunk (0–1) || Reardon (1) || 12,577 || 2–0 || W2
|-style= background:#cfc
| 3 || April 9 || Athletics || 5–4 || Berenguer (1–0) || Howell (0–1) || — || 11,586 || 3–0 || W3
|-style= background:#cfc
| 4 || April 10 || @ Mariners || 8–1 || Smithson (1–0) || Morgan (0–1) || — || 38,122 || 4–0 || W4
|-style= background:#fbb
| 5 || April 11 || @ Mariners || 5–6 || Nunez (1–0) || Reardon (0–1) || — || 26,312 || 4–1 || L1
|-style= background:#cfc
| 6 || April 12 || @ Mariners || 8–5 || Blyleven (1–0) || Langston (0–2) || Berenguer (1) || 9,358 || 5–1 || W1
|-style= background:#fbb
| 7 || April 13 || @ Athletics || 3–6 || Howell (1–1) || Frazier (1–1) || — || 14,447 || 5–2 || L1
|-style= background:#cfc
| 8 || April 14 || @ Athletics || 9–8 || Atherton (1–0) || || Reardon (2) || 10,435 || 6–2 || W1
|-style= background:#cfc
| 9 || April 15 || @ Athletics || 5–2 || Smithson (2–0) || Stewart (0–2) || Reardon (3) || 17,182 || 7–2 || W2
|-style= background:#fbb
| 10 || April 17 || @ Angels || 1–2 || Witt (2–1) || Blyleven (1–1) || — || 36,175 || 7–3 || L1
|-style= background:#fbb
| 11 || April 18 || @ Angels || 0–1 || Candelaria (2–0) || Viola (1–1) || Moore (2) || 36,881 || 7–4 || L2
|-style= background:#cfc
| 12 || April 19 || @ Angels || 6–5 || Portugal (1–0) || Sutton (0–3) || Reardon (4) || 49,627 || 8–4 || W1
|-style= background:#cfc
| 13 || April 20 || Mariners || 13–5 || Smithson (3–0) || Morgan (0–3) || — || 11,927 || 9–4 || W2
|-style= background:#cfc
| 14 || April 21 || Mariners || 6–1 || Straker (1–0) || Trujillo (1–1) || — || 10,776 || 10–4 || W3
|-style= background:#fbb
| 15 || April 22 || Mariners || 3–4 || Langston (2–2) || Frazier (1–2) || — || 11,247 || 10–5 || L1
|-style= background:#fbb
| 16 || April 23 || Angels || 3–7 || Candelaria (3–0) || Viola (1–2) || Moore (3) || 14,204 || 10–6 || L2
|-style= background:#fbb
| 17 || April 24 || Angels || 1–8 || Sutton (1–3) || Portugal (1–1) || — || 20,116 || 10–7 || L3
|-style= background:#cfc
| 18 || April 25 || Angels || 8–7 || Reardon (1–1) || Finley (0–1) || — || 51,717 || 11–7 || W1
|-style= background:#cfc
| 19 || April 26 || Angels || 10–5 || Frazier (2–2) || Cook (1–1) || — || 19,116 || 12–7 || W2
|-style= background:#fbb
| 20 || April 28 || @ Blue Jays || 1–5 || Clancy (2–2) || Viola (1–3) || — || 21,182 || 12–8 || L1
|-style= background:#fbb
| 21 || April 29 || @ Blue Jays || 1–8 || Johnson (1–2) || Smithson (3–1) || — || 19,020 || 12–9 || L2
|-

|-style= background:#cfc
| 22 || May 1 || Yankees || 7–4 || Blyleven (2–1) || Rhoden (2–3) || Reardon (5) || 23,531 || 13–9 || W1
|-style= background:#fbb
| 23 || May 2 || Yankees || 4–6 || John (2–0) || Viola (1–4) || Righetti (7) || 33,173 || 13–10 || L1
|-style= background:#cfc
| 24 || May 3 || Yankees || 4–3 || Frazier (3–2) || Stoddard (0–1) || Reardon (6) || 23,798 || 14–10 || W1
|-style= background:#fbb
| 25 || May 5 || Orioles || 4–5 || Bell (3–1) || Smithson (3–2) || Dixon (1) || 8,891 || 14–11 || L1
|-style= background:#fbb
| 26 || May 6 || Orioles || 0–6 || McGregor (1–4) || Blyleven (2–2) || — || 10,840 || 14–12 || L2
|-style= background:#cfc
| 27 || May 7 || Orioles || 5–2 || Viola (2–4) || Flanagan (0–5) || Reardon (7) || 14,198 || 15–12 || W1
|-style= background:#fbb
| 28 || May 8 || @ Yankees || 7–11 || Guante (2–1) || Reardon (1–2) || — || 25,921 || 15–13 || L1
|-style= background:#cfc
| 29 || May 9 || @ Yankees || 2–0 || Straker (2–0) || Rasmussen (2–2) || Reardon (8) || 27,220 || 16–13 || W1
|-style= background:#fbb
| 30 || May 10 || @ Yankees || 1–6 || Hudson (5–0) || Smithson (3–3) || — || 41,691 || 16–14 || L1
|-style= background:#cfc
| 31 || May 11 || @ Orioles || 10–4 || Blyleven (3–2) || McGregor (1–5) || — || 25,353 || 17–14 || W1
|-style= background:#fbb
| 32 || May 12 || @ Orioles || 7–10 || Dixon (3–2) || Reardon (1–3) || — || 14,279 || 17–15 || L1
|-style= background:#fbb
| 33 || May 13 || Blue Jays || 0–7 || Clancy (5–2) || Portugal (1–2) || — || 9,158 || 17–16 || L2
|-style= background:#fbb
| 34 || May 14 || Blue Jays || 4–16 || Stieb (2–2) || Straker (2–1) || — || 10,053 || 17–17 || L3
|-style= background:#cfc
| 35 || May 15 || Red Sox || 3–1 || Frazier (4–2) || Hurst (4–4) || — || 13,878 || 18–17 || W1
|-style= background:#fbb
| 36 || May 16 || Red Sox || 1–6 || Clemens (3–3) || Blyleven (3–3) || — || 23,414 || 18–18 || L1
|-style= background:#cfc
| 37 || May 17 || Red Sox || 10–8 (10) || Atherton (2–0) || Schiraldi (1–3) || — || 20,716 || 19–18 || W1
|-style= background:#fbb
| 38 || May 19 || @ Indians || 3–4 || Schrom (3–4) || Portugal (1–3) || — || 7,045 || 19–19 || L1
|-style= background:#cfc
| 39 || May 20 || @ Indians || 8–2 || Berenguer (2–0) || Candiotti (1–6) || — || 6,226 || 20–19 || W1
|-style= background:#fbb
| 40 || May 21 || @ Indians || 3–6 || Swindell (3–3) || Blyleven (3–4) || — || 7,401 || 20–20 || L1
|-style= background:#fbb
| 41 || May 22 || Tigers || 2–3 || Morris (5–2) || Viola (2–5) || — || 15,423 || 20–21 || L2
|-style= background:#cfc
| 42 || May 23 || Tigers || 7–5 || Anderson (1–0) || Terrell (3–5) || Reardon (9) || 18,601 || 21–21 || W1
|-style= background:#fbb
| 43 || May 24 || Tigers || 2–7 || Robinson (3–2) || Atherton (2–1) || — || 16,351 || 21–22 || L1
|-style= background:#cfc
| 44 || May 26 || Brewers || 4–2 || Blyleven (4–4) || Nieves (3–2) || Reardon (10) || 23,276 || 22–22 || W1
|-style= background:#cfc
| 45 || May 27 || Brewers || 7–2 || Viola (3–5) || Wegman (3–5) || Frazier (1) || 22,947 || 23–22 || W2
|-style= background:#cfc
| 46 || May 28 || Brewers || 13–1 || Berenguer (3–0) || Birkbeck (1–4) || — || 26,203 || 24–22 || W3
|-style= background:#fbb
| 47 || May 29 || @ Tigers || 7–15 || Terrell (4–5) || Straker (2–2) || — || 19,031 || 24–23 || L1
|- style= background:#bbb
| — || May 30 || @ Tigers || colspan="7" |Postponed (rain) (Rescheduled May 31)
|-style= background:#cfc
| 48 || May 31 (1) || @ Tigers || 9–5 || Reardon (2–3) || King (2–4) || — || n/a || 25–23 || W1
|-style= background:#cfc
| 49 || May 31 (2) || @ Tigers || 11–3 || Frazier (5–2) || Tanana (4–3) || — || 20,993 || 26–23 || W2
|-

|-style= background:#cfc
| 50 || June 1 || @ Red Sox || 9–5 || Viola (4–5) || Clemens (4–5) || — || 20,221 || 27–23 || W3
|-style= background:#fbb
| 51 || June 2 || @ Red Sox || 5–6 || Schiraldi (3–3) || Reardon (2–4) || — || 16,910 || 27–24 || L1
|-style= background:#fbb
| 52 || June 3 || @ Red Sox || 6–7 (10) || Schiraldi (4–3) || Klink (0–1) || — || 20,638 || 27–25 || L2
|-style= background:#fbb
| 53 || June 5 || Rangers || 9–15 || Harris (2–4) || Blyleven (4–5) || — || 16,092 || 27–26 || L3
|-style= background:#cfc
| 54 || June 6 || Rangers || 3–2 (13) || Atherton (3–1) || Williams (3–3) || — || 24,992 || 28–26 || W1
|-style= background:#cfc
| 55 || June 7 || Rangers || 7–4 || Atherton (4–1) || Russell (0–1) || — || 15,795 || 29–26 || W2
|-style= background:#cfc
| 56 || June 8 || Royals || 5–3 || Niemann (1–0) || Gubicza (3–7) || Reardon (11) || 17,815 || 30–26 || W3
|-style= background:#cfc
| 57 || June 9 || Royals || 5–2 || Niekro (1–0) || Jackson (2–8) || Atherton (1) || 18,563 || 31–26 || W4
|-style= background:#cfc
| 58 || June 10 || Royals || 4–3 (10) || Reardon (3–4) || Gleaton (1–2) || — || 18,560 || 32–26 || W5
|- style= background:#bbb
| — || June 11 || @ White Sox || colspan="7" |Postponed (rain) (Rescheduled June 12)
|-style= background:#cfc
| 59 || June 12 (1) || @ White Sox || 5–2 || Viola (5–5) || Long (3–2) || Reardon (12) || n/a || 33–26 || W6
|-style= background:#cfc
| 60 || June 12 (2) || @ White Sox || 7–4 || Berenguer (4–0) || Nielsen (0–1) || Atherton (2) || 18,906 || 34–26 || W7
|-style= background:#fbb
| 61 || June 13 || @ White Sox || 2–6 || Dotson (4–4) || Straker (2–3) || James (8) || 28,087 || 34–27 || L1
|-style= background:#cfc
| 62 || June 14 || @ White Sox || 6–3 || Niekro (2–0) || DeLeon (4–6) || Berenguer (2) || 17,334 || 35–27 || W1
|-style= background:#cfc
| 63 || June 15 || @ Brewers || 5–0 || Blyleven (5–5) || Wegman (5–6) || — || 18,403 || 36–27 || W2
|-style= background:#cfc
| 64 || June 16 || @ Brewers || 7–3 || Viola (6–5) || Crim (3–4) || Reardon (13) || 21,613 || 37–27 || W3
|-style= background:#fbb
| 65 || June 17 || @ Brewers || 5–8 || Clear (5–1) || Straker (2–4) || Plesac (14) || 23,389 || 37–28 || L1
|-style= background:#cfc
| 66 || June 19 || White Sox || 7–6 || Reardon (4–4) || Winn (2–3) || — || 24,123 || 38–28 || W1
|-style= background:#fbb
| 67 || June 20 || White Sox || 5–10 || DeLeon (5–6) || Blyleven (5–6) || — || 33,636 || 38–29 || L1
|-style= background:#cfc
| 68 || June 21 || White Sox || 8–6 || Berenguer (5–0) || Winn (2–4) || Reardon (14) || 29,240 || 39–29 || W1
|-style= background:#cfc
| 69 || June 23 || Indians || 9–4 || Smithson (4–3) || Candiotti (2–8) || Frazier (2) || 17,393 || 40–29 || W2
|-style= background:#cfc
| 70 || June 24 || Indians || 14–8 || Straker (3–4) || Swindell (3–7) || — || 19,885 || 41–29 || W3
|-style= background:#cfc
| 71 || June 25 || Indians || 4–3 || Blyleven (6–6) || Niekro (5–7) || Reardon (15) || 27,489 || 42–29 || W4
|-style= background:#fbb
| 72 || June 26 || @ Rangers || 0–1 || Witt (3–3) || Viola (6–6) || Mohorcic (10) || 20,605 || 42–30 || L1
|-style= background:#fbb
| 73 || June 27 (1) || @ Rangers || 6–11 || Correa (3–5) || Frazier (5–3) || Russell (2) || n/a || 42–31 || L2
|-style= background:#fbb
| 74 || June 27 (2) || @ Rangers || 2–7 || Hough (8–3) || Atherton (4–2) || — || 35,677 || 42–32 || L3
|-style= background:#fbb
| 75 || June 28 || @ Rangers || 3–6 || Guzman (6–6) || Smithson (4–4) || Mohorcic (11) || 17,477 || 42–33 || L4
|-style= background:#fbb
| 76 || June 29 || @ Royals || 2–3 (5) || Jackson (4–10) || Straker (3–5) || — || 35,872 || 42–34 || L5
|-style= background:#cfc
| 77 || June 30 || @ Royals || 3–1 || Blyleven (7–6) || Leibrandt (8–6) || Reardon (16) || 21,515 || 43–34 || W1
|-

|-style= background:#fbb
| 78 || July 1 || @ Royals || 3–4 || Quisenberry (3–0) || Atherton (4–3) || — || 26,899 || 43–35 || L1
|-style= background:#fbb
| 79 || July 2 || @ Royals || 3–10 || Saberhagen (14–2) || Niekro (2–1) || — || 35,992 || 43–36 || L2
|-style= background:#cfc
| 80 || July 3 || Orioles || 6–5 (11) || Reardon (5–4) || Niedenfuer (1–1) || — || 26,331 || 44–36 || W1
|-style= background:#cfc
| 81 || July 4 || Orioles || 4–1 || Straker (4–5) || Bell (6–6) || Berenguer (3) || 23,724 || 45–36 || W2
|-style= background:#cfc
| 82 || July 5 || Orioles || 4–3 || Blyleven (8–6) || Niedenfuer (1–2) || — || 21,294 || 46–36 || W3
|-style= background:#cfc
| 83 || July 6 || @ Yankees || 2–0 || Viola (7–6) || Guidry (1–4) || — || 20,141 || 47–36 || W4
|-style= background:#fbb
| 84 || July 7 || @ Yankees || 7–12 || Stoddard (2–1) || Atherton (4–4) || — || 27,697 || 47–37 || L1
|-style= background:#fbb
| 85 || July 8 || @ Yankees || 4–13 || Rhoden (11–5) || Smithson (4–5) || Clements (4) || 38,168 || 47–38 || L2
|-style= background:#cfc
| 86 || July 9 || @ Orioles || 3–1 || Straker (5–5) || Bell (6–7) || Reardon (17) || 22,656 || 48–38 || W1
|-style= background:#fbb
| 87 || July 10 || @ Orioles || 12–13 || Williamson (3–6) || Frazier (5–4) || — || 28,057 || 48–39 || L1
|-style= background:#cfc
| 88 || July 11 || @ Orioles || 2–1 || Viola (8–6) || Griffin (1–3) || — || 25,690 || 49–39 || W1
|-style= background:#fbb
| 89 || July 12 || @ Orioles || 0–5 || Schmidt (9–2) || Niekro (2–2) || — || 27,486 || 49–40 || L1
|- style="text-align:center; background:#bbcaff;"
| colspan="10" | 58th All-Star Game in Oakland, California
|-style= background:#fbb
| 90 || July 16 || Blue Jays || 2–5 || Key (10–6) || Blyleven (8–7) || Henke (18) || 34,334 || 49–41 || L2
|-style= background:#cfc
| 91 || July 17 || Blue Jays || 3–2 || Viola (9–6) || Eichhorn (8–5) || Reardon (18) || 28,234 || 50–41 || W1
|-style= background:#fbb
| 92 || July 18 || Blue Jays || 5–7 || Stieb (8–5) || Niekro (2–3) || — || 38,365 || 50–42 || L1
|-style= background:#cfc
| 93 || July 19 || Blue Jays || 7–6 || Schatzeder (1–0) || Lavelle (1–1) || Reardon (19) || 32,095 || 51–42 || W1
|-style= background:#fbb
| 94 || July 20 || Yankees || 1–7 || John (9–3) || Straker (5–6) || — || 34,966 || 51–43 || L1
|-style= background:#cfc
| 95 || July 21 || Yankees || 2–1 || Blyleven (9–7) || Stoddard (2–2) || — || 37,391 || 52–43 || W1
|-style= background:#cfc
| 96 || July 22 || Yankees || 3–1 || Viola (10–6) || Rhoden (12–6) || Reardon (20) || 40,054 || 53–43 || W2
|-style= background:#fbb
| 97 || July 23 || @ Blue Jays || 3–4 || Stieb (9–5) || Frazier (5–5) || — || 35,320 || 53–44 || L1
|-style= background:#fbb
| 98 || July 24 || @ Blue Jays || 6–8 || Eichhorn (9–5) || Reardon (5–5) || Henke (20) || 30,382 || 53–45 || L2
|-style= background:#cfc
| 99 || July 25 || @ Blue Jays || 13–9 || Schatzeder (2–0) || Musselman (7–4) || — || 36,395 || 54–45 || W1
|-style= background:#fbb
| 100 || July 26 || @ Blue Jays || 2–4 || Key (11–6) || Blyleven (9–8) || Henke (21) || 33,393 || 54–46 || L1
|-style= background:#cfc
| 101 || July 27 || @ Mariners || 4–3 || Viola (11–6) || Nunez (3–2) || Reardon (21) || 13,858 || 55–46 || W1
|-style= background:#fbb
| 102 || July 28 || @ Mariners || 1–6 || Morgan (8–11) || Niekro (2–4) || — || 13,495 || 55–47 || L1
|-style= background:#fbb
| 103 || July 29 || @ Mariners || 3–8 || Guetterman (9–2) || Smithson (4–6) || — || 14,320 || 55–48 || L2
|-style= background:#cfc
| 104 || July 31 || @ Athletics || 5–3 || Blyleven (10–8) || Lamp (1–2) || Reardon (22) || 32,097 || 56–48 || W1
|-

|-style= background:#fbb
| 105 || August 1 || @ Athletics || 2–3 || Stewart (14–7) || Viola (11–7) || — || 40,929 || 56–49 || L1
|-style= background:#fbb
| 106 || August 2 || @ Athletics || 5–6 (11) || Nelson (5–2) || Reardon (5–6) || — || 33,215 || 56–50 || L2
|-style= background:#cfc
| 107 || August 3 || @ Angels || 11–3 || Schatzeder (3–0) || Witt (13–7) || — || 33,983 || 57–50 || W1
|-style= background:#fbb
| 108 || August 4 || @ Angels || 3–12 || Sutton (8–9) || Carlton (0–1) || Lucas (2) || 37,371 || 57–51 || L1
|-style= background:#fbb
| 109 || August 5 || @ Angels || 1–6 || Candelaria (6–3) || Blyleven (10–9) || — || 34,059 || 57–52 || L2
|-style= background:#cfc
| 110 || August 6 || Athletics || 9–4 || Viola (12–7) || Stewart (14–8) || — || 39,177 || 58–52 || W1
|-style= background:#cfc
| 111 || August 7 || Athletics || 9–4 || Niekro (3–4) || Lamp (1–3) || — || 36,146 || 59–52 || W2
|-style= background:#cfc
| 112 || August 8 || Athletics || 9–2 || Carlton (1–1) || Young (10–6) || — || 50,237 || 60–52 || W3
|-style= background:#cfc
| 113 || August 9 || Athletics || 7–5 || Blyleven (11–9) || Ontiveros (6–6) || Reardon (23) || 33,948 || 61–52 || W4
|-style= background:#cfc
| 114 || August 11 || Angels || 7–2 || Viola (13–7) || Candelaria (6–4) || — || 39,163 || 62–52 || W5
|-style= background:#fbb
| 115 || August 12 || Angels || 2–8 || McCaskill (3–4) || Straker (5–7) || — || 33,033 || 62–53 || L1
|-style= background:#fbb
| 116 || August 13 || Angels || 1–5 || Witt (14–8) || Carlton (1–2) || — || 35,837 || 62–54 || L2
|-style= background:#cfc
| 117 || August 14 || Mariners || 6–3 || Blyleven (12–9) || Morgan (10–12) || — || 26,291 || 63–54 || W1
|-style= background:#cfc
| 118 || August 15 || Mariners || 14–4 || Smith (1–0) || Guetterman (9–4) || — || 31,154 || 64–54 || W2
|-style= background:#cfc
| 119 || August 16 || Mariners || 5–1 || Viola (14–7) || Moore (5–15) || — || 28,006 || 65–54 || W3
|-style= background:#cfc
| 120 || August 17 || Mariners || 4–2 || Straker (6–7) || Langston (13–10) || Reardon (24) || 29,623 || 66–54 || W4
|-style= background:#fbb
| 121 || August 18 || @ Tigers || 2–11 || Morris (14–6) || Carlton (1–3) || — || 32,053 || 66–55 || L1
|-style= background:#fbb
| 122 || August 19 || @ Tigers || 1–7 || Terrell (10–10) || Blyleven (12–10) || — || 38,163 || 66–56 || L2
|-style= background:#fbb
| 123 || August 20 || @ Tigers || 0–8 || Alexander (1–0) || Niekro (3–5) || — || 45,804 || 66–57 || L3
|-style= background:#fbb
| 124 || August 21 || @ Red Sox || 3–11 || Clemens (13–7) || Viola (14–8) || Gardner (5) || 33,490 || 66–58 || L4
|-style= background:#fbb
| 125 || August 22 || @ Red Sox || 5–6 || Schiraldi (8–5) || Straker (6–8) || — || 29,794 || 66–59 || L5
|-style= background:#fbb
| 126 || August 23 || @ Red Sox || 4–6 || Sellers (5–6) || Carlton (1–4) || Gardner (6) || 32,956 || 66–60 || L6
|-style= background:#cfc
| 127 || August 24 || Tigers || 5–4 || Reardon (6–6) || King (6–9) || — || 27,338 || 67–60 || W1
|-style= background:#fbb
| 128 || August 25 || Tigers || 4–5 || Alexander (2–0) || Niekro (3–6) || Henneman (4) || 30,639 || 67–61 || L1
|-style= background:#fbb
| 129 || August 26 || Tigers || 8–10 || Petry (8–6) || Reardon (6–7) || Hernández (7) || 29,265 || 67–62 || L2
|-style= background:#fbb
| 130 || August 28 || @ Brewers || 0–1 || Bosio (8–5) || Straker (6–9) || — || 22,461 || 67–63 || L3
|-style= background:#cfc
| 131 || August 29 || @ Brewers || 12–3 || Blyleven (13–10) || Barker (2–1) || — || 34,834 || 68–63 || W1
|-style= background:#cfc
| 132 || August 30 || @ Brewers || 10–6 || Atherton (5–4) || Crim (5–6) || Reardon (25) || 22,417 || 69—63 || W2
|-

|-style= background:#fbb
| 133 || September 1 || Red Sox || 0–9 || Sellers (6–6) || Niekro (3–7) || — || 25,508 || 69–64 || L1
|-style= background:#cfc
| 134 || September 2 || Red Sox || 5–4 || Straker (7–9) || Nipper (8–11) || Reardon (26) || 19,565 || 70–64 || W1
|-style= background:#cfc
| 135 || September 3 || Red Sox || 2–1 (10) || Atherton (6–4) || Gardner (1–6) || — || 20,009 || 71–64 || W2
|-style= background:#cfc
| 136 || September 4 || Brewers || 2–1 (12) || Berenguer (6–0) || Plesac (5–5) || — || 27,380 || 72–64 || W3
|-style= background:#cfc
| 137 || September 5 || Brewers || 2–1 || Atherton (7–4) || Crim (5–7) || — || 51,122 || 73–64 || W4
|-style= background:#fbb
| 138 || September 6 || Brewers || 0–6 || Higuera (15–9) || Carlton (1–5) || — || 36,586 || 73–65 || L1
|-style= background:#cfc
| 139 || September 7 || White Sox || 8–1 || Bittiger (1–0) || LaPoint (3–3) || — || 22,623 || 74–65 || W1
|-style= background:#fbb
| 140 || September 8 || White Sox || 3–4 || Bannister (12–10) || Blyleven (13–11) || Thigpen (9) || 12,360 || 74–66 || L1
|-style= background:#cfc
| 141 || September 9 || White Sox || 2–1 || Viola (15–8) || Winn (4–6) || — || 15,394 || 75–66 || W1
|-style= background:#cfc
| 142 || September 11 || @ Indians || 13–10 (11) || Reardon (7–7) || Gordon (0–3) || Berenguer (4) || 7,964 || 76–66 || W2
|-style= background:#fbb
| 143 || September 12 || @ Indians || 4–5 || Jones (4–4) || Berenguer (6–1) || — || 9,156 || 76–67 || L1
|-style= background:#cfc
| 144 || September 13 || @ Indians || 7–3 (10) || Reardon (8–7) || Candiotti (7–16) || — || 7,474 || 77–67 || W1
|-style= background:#fbb
| 145 || September 14 || @ White Sox || 2–8 || LaPoint (4–3) || Viola (15–9) || — || 7,898 || 77–68 || L1
|-style= background:#fbb
| 146 || September 15 || @ White Sox || 2–6 || McDowell (1–0) || Niekro (3–8) || — || 7,947 || 77–69 || L2
|-style= background:#fbb
| 147 || September 16 || @ White Sox || 10–13 || DeLeon (10–12) || Smithson (4–7) || Thigpen (11) || 8,921 || 77–70 || L3
|-style= background:#cfc
| 148 || September 18 || Indians || 9–4 || Blyleven (14–11) || Akerfelds (2–5) || — || 23,173 || 78–70 || W1
|-style= background:#cfc
| 149 || September 19 || Indians || 3–1 || Viola (16–9) || Candiotti (7–17) || Reardon (27) || 23,581 || 79–70 || W2
|-style= background:#cfc
| 150 || September 20 || Indians || 3–2 || Straker (8–9) || Yett (3–8) || Reardon (28) || 18,906 || 80–70 || W3
|-style= background:#cfc
| 151 || September 22 || Rangers || 6–4 || Niekro (4–8) || Harris (5–10) || Reardon (29) || 18,294 || 81–70 || W4
|-style= background:#cfc
| 152 || September 23 || Rangers || 4–2 || Berenguer (7–1) || Guzman (14–12) || Reardon (30) || 20,640 || 82–70 || W5
|-style= background:#cfc
| 153 || September 24 || Rangers || 4–0 || Viola (17–9) || Hough (17–12) || — || 23,496 || 83–70 || W6
|-style= background:#fbb
| 154 || September 25 || Royals || 4–6 || Farr (4–3) || Schatzeder (3–1) || Garber (6) || 52,704 || 83–71 || L1
|-style= background:#fbb
| 155 || September 26 || Royals || 4–7 || Davis (5–2) || Reardon (8–8) || Garber (7) || 46,263 || 83–72 || L2
|-style= background:#cfc
| 156 || September 27 || Royals || 8–1 || Blyleven (15–11) || Leibrandt (15–11) || — || 53,106 || 84–72 || W1
|-style= background:#cfc
| 157 || September 28 || @ Rangers || 5–3 || Berenguer (8–1) || Guzman (14–13) || Reardon (31) || 9,986 || 85–72 || W2
|-style= background:#fbb
| 158 || September 29 || @ Rangers || 5–7 || Hough (18–12) || Atherton (7–5) || — || 10,328 || 85–73 || L1
|-style= background:#fbb
| 159 || September 30 || @ Rangers || 1–2 || Witt (8–10) || Straker (8–10) || — || 9,309 || 85–74 || L2
|-

|-style= background:#fbb
| 160 || October 2 || @ Royals || 3–6 || Saberhagen (18–10) || Viola (17–10) || — || 22,578 || 85–75 || L3
|-style= background:#fbb
| 161 || October 3 || @ Royals || 2–4 || Leibrandt (16–11) || Blyleven (15–12) || Garber (8) || 28,082 || 85–76 || L4
|-style= background:#fbb
| 162 || October 4 || @ Royals || 1–10 || Gubicza (13–18) || Niekro (4–9) || — || 26,341 || 85–77 || L5
|-

|-
| Legend:       = Win       = Loss       = PostponementBold = Twins team member

Notable transactions
 March 31, 1987: Minor leaguers Jose Dominguez and Ray Velázquez and a player to be named later were traded by the Twins to the San Francisco Giants for outfielder Dan Gladden and minor leaguer David Blakely. The Twins completed the deal by sending Bryan Hickerson to the Giants on June 15.
 May 10, 1987: Bill Latham was traded by the Twins to the New York Mets for Jayson Felice (minors).
 May 22, 1987: Sal Butera was signed as a free agent by the Twins.
 June 2, 1987: 1987 Major League Baseball draft
Willie Banks was drafted by the Twins in the 1st round (3rd pick overall).
Terry Jorgensen was drafted by the Twins in the 2nd round.
Larry Casian was drafted by the Twins in the 6th round.
Mark Guthrie was drafted by the Twins in the 7th round.
Chip Hale was drafted by the Twins in the 17th round
Bret Boone was drafted by the Twins in the 28th round, but did not sign.
Craig Paquette was drafted by the Twins in the 36th round, but did not sign.
 June 2, 1987: Eric Bullock was traded by the Houston Astros to the Minnesota Twins for Clay Christiansen.
 June 7, 1987: Mark Salas was traded by the Twins to the New York Yankees for pitcher Joe Niekro.
 June 24, 1987: Danny Clay and Tom Schwarz (minors) were traded by the Twins to the Philadelphia Phillies for Dan Schatzeder and cash.
 July 31: The Twins traded a player to be named later to the Cleveland Indians for Steve Carlton. The Twins completed the trade by sending minor leaguer Jeff Perry to the Indians on August 18.
 September 1: The Twins traded a player to be named later to the Boston Red Sox for designated hitter Don Baylor. The Twins completed the deal by sending minor leaguer Enrique Rios to the Red Sox on December 18.

Opening Day Lineup

Roster

Player stats

Batting

Starters by position
Note: Pos = Position; G = Games played; AB = At bats; H = Hits; Avg. = Batting average; HR = Home runs; RBI = Runs batted in

Other batters
Note: G = Games played; AB = At bats; H = Hits; Avg. = Batting average; HR = Home runs; RBI = Runs batted in

Pitching

Starting pitchers
Note: G = Games pitched; IP = Innings pitched; W = Wins; L = Losses; ERA = Earned run average; SO = Strikeouts

Other pitchers 
Note: G = Games pitched; IP = Innings pitched; W = Wins; L = Losses; ERA = Earned run average; SO = Strikeouts

Relief pitchers 
Note: G = Games pitched; W = Wins; L = Losses; SV = Saves; ERA = Earned run average; SO = Strikeouts

Postseason

See 1987 American League Championship Series and 1987 World Series.

The Twins won the American League Championship Series beating the Detroit Tigers 4 games to 1.  Gary Gaetti was named the ALCS MVP.  He'd set a record by homering in his first two post-season at-bats.  The Twins won the series by winning two of the three road games at Detroit despite a 4-8 regular season record vs the Tigers as well as 29 regular season wins on the road.

The Twins won all four home games to top the St. Louis Cardinals in the World Series.  Frank Viola was named the Series' MVP even though it was the Twins bats that were instrumental in the first three wins outscoring St. Louis 29-10 in the process.

Game log

|- style= background:#cfc
| 1 || October 7 || Tigers || 8–5 || Reardon (1–0) || Alexander (0–1) || — || 53,269 || 1–0
|- style= background:#cfc
| 2 || October 8 || Tigers || 6–3 || Blyleven (1–0) || Morris (0–1) || Berenguer (1) || 55,245 || 2–0
|-style= background:#fbb
| 3 || October 10 || @ Tigers || 6–7 || Henneman (1–0) || Reardon (1–1) || — || 49,730 || 2–1
|- style= background:#cfc
| 4 || October 11 || @ Tigers || 5–3 || Viola (1–0) || Tanana (0–1) || Reardon (1) || 51,939 || 3–1
|- style= background:#cfc
| 5 || October 12 || @ Tigers || 9–5 || Blyleven (2–0) || Alexander (0–2) || Reardon (2) || 47,448 || 4–1
|-

|- style= background:#cfc
| 1 || October 17 || Cardinals || 10–1 || Viola (1–0) || Magrane (0–1) || — || 55,171 || 1–0
|- style= background:#cfc
| 2 || October 18 || Cardinals || 8–4 || Blyleven (1–0) || Cox (0–1) || — || 55,257 || 2–0
|-style= background:#fbb
| 3 || October 20 || @ Cardinals || 1–3 || Tudor (1–0) || Berenguer (0–1) || Worrell (1) || 55,347 || 2–1
|-style= background:#fbb
| 4 || October 21 || @ Cardinals || 2–7 || Forsch (1–0) || Viola (1–1) || Dayley (1) || 55,347 || 2–2
|-style= background:#fbb
| 5 || October 22 || @ Cardinals || 2–4 || Cox (1–1) || Blyleven (1–1) || Worrell (2) || 55,347 || 2–3
|- style= background:#cfc
| 6 || October 24 || Cardinals || 11–5 || Schatzeder (1–0) || Tudor (1–1) || — || 55,293 || 3–3
|- style= background:#cfc
| 7 || October 25 || Cardinals || 4–2 || Viola (2–1) || Cox (1–2) || Reardon (1) || 55,376 || 4–3
|-

|-
| Legend:       = Win       = Loss       = PostponementBold = Twins team member

Farm system 

LEAGUE CHAMPIONS: Kenosha

References

External links
Player stats from baseball-reference.com
Team info from www.baseball-almanac.com
1987 Standings
A set of 10 audio clips of plays from the World Series with the Cardinals

Minnesota Twins seasons
Minnesota Twins season
American League West champion seasons
American League champion seasons
World Series champion seasons
1987 in sports in Minnesota